Moel Finian (died 967)  was an Irish bishop in the 10th century: the son of Uchtain; he was also abbot of Kells.

References 

967 deaths
Year of birth unknown
10th-century Irish bishops
Bishops of Kells